Aguilar v. Felton, 473 U.S. 402 (1985), was a United States Supreme Court case holding that New York City's program that sent public school teachers into parochial schools to provide remedial education to disadvantaged children pursuant to Title I of the Elementary and Secondary Education Act of 1965 necessitated an excessive entanglement of church and state and violated the Establishment Clause of the First Amendment to the United States Constitution.

Aguilar v. Felton was subsequently overruled by Agostini v. Felton, 521 U.S. 203 (1997).

References

Further reading

External links

United States Supreme Court cases
Establishment Clause case law
1985 in United States case law
1985 in religion
Overruled United States Supreme Court decisions
New York City Department of Education
Religion and education
United States Supreme Court cases of the Burger Court
1985 in education
City of New York litigation